Angsuman Chotisathein (born 21 July 1949) is a Thai sports shooter. She competed in the women's 25 metre pistol event at the 1984 Summer Olympics.

References

External links
 

1949 births
Living people
Angsuman Chotisathein
Angsuman Chotisathein
Shooters at the 1984 Summer Olympics
Place of birth missing (living people)
Shooters at the 1986 Asian Games
Asian Games medalists in shooting
Angsuman Chotisathein
Medalists at the 1986 Asian Games
Angsuman Chotisathein